The Ritual Continues is the second studio album by Djam Karet, released in 1987 by HC Productions.

Track listing

Personnel
Adapted from The Ritual Continues liner notes.

Djam Karet
Gayle Ellett – guitar, guitar synthesizer, percussion
Andy Frankel – percussion on "A City With Two Tales" and "Fractured"
Mike Henderson – guitar, twelve-string guitar, percussion
Chuck Oken – drums keyboards, tape, percussion, production
Henry J. Osborne – bass guitar, percussion

Production and additional personnel
Randy Baker – photography
Rychard Cooper – production, engineering, recording
Loren Nerell – engineering, recording

Release history

References

External links 
 
 The Ritual Continues at Bandcamp

1987 albums
Djam Karet albums